Pleasant View Township is a township in Cherokee County, Kansas, USA.  As of the 2000 census, its population was 658.

Geography
According to the USGS, it contains four cemeteries: Bird, Crocker, Lone Oak and Old Pleasant View.

The streams of Brush Creek, Long Branch and Taylor Branch run through this township.

References
 USGS Geographic Names Information System (GNIS)

External links
 City-Data.com

Townships in Cherokee County, Kansas
Townships in Kansas